Prestatyn Community Hospital was a community hospital in Prestatyn, Wales. It was managed by Betsi Cadwaladr University Health Board.

History
The hospital was established in a former preparatory school building known as Chatsworth House in the late 1940s. It joined the National Health Service as Chatsworth House Maternity Home in 1948 and then became a community hospital in 1973 before finally closing in 2013. The building was demolished and the site redeveloped for residential use in 2015.

References

Prestatyn
Hospitals in Denbighshire
Defunct hospitals in Wales